Litoria hilli is a species of frog in the subfamily Pelodryadinae. It is endemic to the Tagula Island of Papua New Guinea.

References

hilli
Amphibians of Papua New Guinea
Endemic fauna of Papua New Guinea
Amphibians described in 2006